Uvariopsis korupensis is a species of flowering plant in the family Annonaceae endemic to Cameroon.

Description 
This shrub or small tree is of a height of 6 to 15 m, with a trunk of up to 14 cm in diameter. Young branches slightly velvet. Leaves coriaceous, glabrous, oblong-oblanceolate, 30–52 cm long, 9-14 cm broad. The inflorescence is fasciculate and the (cauliflorous) monoecious flowers are borne on a wooden collar at the base of the trunk (which sometimes extends up to 3.8 m from the base). Flowers orange and cream-coloured. Stigma glabrous, sessile. Fruit ellipsoid-cylindrical, 3–6 cm long, 1.8–3 cm thick. Seeds ellipsoid-oblong, 10–22 mm by 5–8 mm.

Distribution 
Endemic to Cameroon, the species grows in the south-west region on Mounts Cameroon, Korup, Bakossi and  Takamanda. The plant grows in lowland evergreen forest in hilly terrain at an altitude of between 50 and 1,000 metres on wet soils.

Threats 
Uvariopsis korupensis is threatened by deforestation for agriculture and timber. Currently occupying an area of up to 36 square kilometres, it is in continuing decline due to the  loss of its habitat.

Uses 
The leaves are wrapped around fish before cooking in the littoral provinces of Cameroon.

See also 

 Korup National Park

References

External links 
  Gereau, R.E. & David Kenfack, D. (2000)  « Le genre Uvariopsis (Annonaceae) en Afrique tropicale, avec la description d’une espèce nouvelle du Cameroun » Adansonia, sér. 3 22(1):39-43
  Onana, J-M. (2013) Synopsis des espèces végétales vasculaires endémiques et rares du Cameroun : check-liste pour la gestion durable et la conservation de la biodiversité,Yaoundé. Ministère de la Recherche scientifique et de l'Innovation, coll. « Flore du Cameroun » (no 40) p. 71
, Royal Botanic Gardens, Kew.

Annonaceae
Endemic flora of Cameroon
Endangered plants
Cauliflory